Sebastian Mannström (born 29 October 1988) is a Finnish professional football winger who plays for Veikkausliiga club KPV and has represented the Finnish national team. Mannström was born in Kokkola, Finland. He began his senior club career playing for GBK, before making his league debut for Jaro at age 19 in 2008.

Mannström made his international debut for Finland in October 2011, at the age of 22.

Club career

GBK

Mannström started his footballing career at his local GBK which he represented on senior level for 4 seasons.

Jaro

Mannström was snapped by FF Jaro in 2008. At Jaro he was an instant first-choice, making in total of 68 appearances and 11 goals during three years with Jakobstad based club.

HJK

On 11 November 2010 HJK announced that they had signed Mannström from Jaro on a two-year contract.

Elversberg

On 1 January 2015 it was announced that Mannström had signed a contract with SV Elversberg.

Inter Turku

On 17 August 2018, Mannström signed a contract with Inter Turku.

Stuttgarter Kickers

On 19 August 2016, he joined Stuttgarter Kickers from Inter Turku to reunite with former manager Alfred Kaminski from his spell at SV Elversberg.

KPV

On 15 June 2018 KPV gave a press release that Mannström would return to Kokkola.

International career 

He made his debut for the Finnish national team on 9 February 2011 in a friendly match in Jules Ottenstadion, Ghent against Belgium.

Career statistics

International

Statistics accurate as of matches played on 26 January 2013

Honours and achievements

Club

GBK
 Kakkonen: 2006

HJK Helsinki
 Veikkausliiga: 2011, 2012, 2013, 2014
 Finnish Cup: 2011, 2014

Elversberg
 Saarland Cup: 2015

References

External links

 Stuttgarter Kickers official profile 
 
 
 
 Sebastian Mannström at Kicker
 Guardian Football
 

1988 births
Living people
Finnish footballers
Finland international footballers
Veikkausliiga players
FF Jaro players
FC Inter Turku players
SV Elversberg players
Stuttgarter Kickers players
Helsingin Jalkapalloklubi players
Regionalliga players
Association football wingers
GBK Kokkola players
People from Kokkola
Sportspeople from Central Ostrobothnia